The 2010 Washington Huskies football team represented the University of Washington in the 2010 NCAA Division I FBS football season. Led by second-year head coach Steve Sarkisian, the Huskies played their home games on campus at Husky Stadium in Seattle and were members of the Pacific-10 Conference.

Washington compiled a 6–6 record in the regular season (5–4 in Pac-10, tied for third), and were invited to their first bowl game in eight years. At the Holiday Bowl in San Diego, they upset favored Nebraska 19–7 to finish on a four-game winning streak at 7–6.

Preseason
Quarterback Jake Locker, a Heisman hopeful, decided to return to Washington in 2010 as a fifth-year senior. In 2009, he passed for 2,800 yards and 21 touchdowns. Had Locker decided to enter the 2010 NFL Draft after his junior year, many draft analysts predicted he would have been a top five pick.

Sophomore running back Chris Polk was primed for another 1,000-yard rushing season. In 2009, Polk had 1,113 yards, averaging 4.9 yards per carry, and scored five touchdowns. Polk surpassed 100 yards rushing in four of the final five games of the season, just missing in the season finale against California (94 yards).

Schedule

Game summaries

BYU

Syracuse

Nebraska

This will be the 8th time these teams have met for non-conference play, with the series currently tied at 3-3-1.  Nebraska owns the overall scoring edge at 146-109, and also the last victory, a 55-7 triumph in front of a sold-out home stadium crowd in 1998.  This is the start of a home and home series with the Huskies visiting Nebraska next year at Memorial Stadium.

USC

Washington upset 18th-ranked USC for the second consecutive season, winning at the Los Angeles Memorial Coliseum on a last-second 30-yard field goal.

Erik Folk, who hit the game-winning field goal, was named Pac-10 special teams player of the week. He went 4-for-4 field goals and two PAT attempts. Folk kicked a 22-yarder to defeat the Trojans 16-13 the previous season.

Arizona State

Oregon State

Jake Locker threw a career-high five touchdown passes, two in overtime to Jermaine Kearse, and the Huskies stopped the Beavers 2-point conversion in double overtime to keep their bowl hopes alive.

Chris Polk ran for 105 yards on 25 carries for the Huskies.

Beavers running back Jacquizz Rodgers ran for 140 yards on 32 carries and three touchdowns. He also caught four passes for 49 yards and a 10-yard TD catch in the first overtime. The Beavers were playing their first game since Rodgers' brother, James, was lost for the season because of a serious knee injury.

The game came down to the Beavers final possession in the second overtime.  On 4th down from the UW 4-yard line, Beaver quarterback Ryan Katz's pass for John Reese fell to the turf in the end zone. The Huskies stormed the field, only then to realize a late flag from back judge Johnny Jenkins was for pass interference against the Huskies' Desmond Trufant.

Jacquizz Rodgers then scored from the 2 on the next play to pull Oregon State to 35-34. Beavers coach Mike Riley called timeout and decided to go for two. But Katz's throw fell out of Joe Halahuni's hands as he was hit by linebacker Cort Dennison and Washington's celebration was on again.

Washington snapped a six-game losing streak to the Beavers.

Arizona

Stanford

Oregon

UCLA

California

Washington scored from the one-yard line without time left in the regulation to defeat Cal and took the Golden Bears out of a bowl game. Chris Polk ran the ball in. Giorgio Tavecchio kicked two field goals for Cal, 53 yards and 47 yards.

For Washington, D'Andre Goodwin scored on an 80-yard pass from Jake Locker and Erik Folk kicked a 37-yard field goal. Cal scored a touchdown in the third quarter when Cameron Jordan took a fumble into the end zone for 21 yards.

Washington State

Chris Polk rushed 29 times for a career-high 284 yards and two touchdowns.  The win gave the Huskies a 6-6 record on the season, sending Washington to a bowl game for the first time since the 2002 Sun Bowl.

Nebraska (Holiday Bowl)

This was the second time this season that the Huskies played Nebraska, with the first meeting ending in a 56-21 win for the Cornhuskers. Washington shocked Nebraska despite a poor game from Jake Locker.

Rankings

Roster

Game starters
The follow players were the game starters.

% - started as third or fourth wide receiver ^ - started as second tight end

Awards and honors
 October 4 - Erik Folk, who hit a 32-yard game-winning field goal to beat the 18th-ranked Trojans, was named Pac-10 Special Teams player of the week.
 December 1 - Linebacker Mason Foster, the Pac-10 conference's leading tackler, was named a first-team all-American by Scout.com
 December 6 - Tailback Chris Polk named Pac-10 Offensive Player of the Week 
December 7 - Linebacker Mason Foster was again awarded for his outstanding performance during the 2010 season when he was named to the 2010 All-Pac-10 first team
December 8 - For the second time this season standout Husky Mason Foster was named a first-team all-American, this time by Rivals.com
December 9 - Junior wide receiver Jermaine Kearse was named to the Rivals.com All-Pac-10 first-team
December 20 - Senior QB Jake Locker was named honorable mention all-America by Pro Football Weekly

NFL Draft
Two Huskies were selected in the 2011 NFL Draft, which lasted seven rounds (254 selections).

Locker was the first Husky selected in the first round in seven years.

References

External links
 2010 University of Washington Weekly football release

Washington
Washington Huskies football seasons
Holiday Bowl champion seasons
Washington Huskies football